Colle di Val d'Elsa or Colle Val d'Elsa is a town and comune in the province of Siena,  Tuscany, central Italy.

It has a population of c. 21,600 . Its name means "Hill of Elsa Valley", where Elsa is the name of the river which crosses it and Valdelsa the name of the valley.

Today, Colle di Val d'Elsa is internationally renowned for the production of crystal glassware and art (15% of world production), largely produced in the industrial lower town.

History

The area was settled by man from at least the 4th millennium BC, but first mentions of the city  are from the 9th century AD. In 1269 it was the seat of a famous battle during the wars of Guelphs and Ghibellines and in 1479 it was besieged by Neapolitan troops. From the 14th century it was a possession of Florence and the Grand Duchy of Tuscany until the unification of Italy in 1860.

In the 20th century it became an important industrial center. During World War II it was bombed by Allied aircraft.

The oldest part of the town is the "colle alta", the higher part, with a well-preserved medieval center. The town  developed along the river from the 11th century onwards, building an artificial canal to power various industrial activities, such as wheat mills and paper factories.

The city is also famous as the birthplace of sculptor and architect Arnolfo di Cambio. The Giottesque painter Cennino Cennini and the poet Isabella Cervoni were also born here.

Main sights
The village is entered through the ancient and monumental Porta Nova and winds its long and narrow way in a sequence of fine 16th- and 17th-century noble houses (notable are Palazzo Usimbardi, Palazzo Buoninsegni and the Town Hall) to the  Palazzo Campana, which marks the entry to the Castle, the oldest part of Colle. Here, the village is characterized by  narrow paved lanes, 15th- and 16th-century noble houses (such as Palazzo Luci, Palazzo Morozzi, Palazzo Giusti, Palazzo Dini) and tower-houses, including the one where Arnolfo di Cambio was born.

Frazioni
The municipality is formed by the city of Colle di Val d'Elsa and the towns and villages (frazioni) of Bibbiano, Borgatello, Campiglia dei Foci, Castel San Gimignano, Collalto, Gracciano dell'Elsa, Le Grazie, Mensanello and Quartaia. Other notable villages within the comune include Boscona, Buliciano, Coneo, Lano, Montegabbro, Onci, Partena, Paurano, Sant'Andrea and Scarna.

Twin towns
 Bir Gandus, Western Sahara

References

External links

Official website 
 Catholic Encyclopedia article

Hilltowns in Tuscany